Eupithecia sibylla is a moth in the family Geometridae. It is found in the regions of Los Gatos (Osomo Province), Antofagasta (Antofagasta Province), Atacama (Chanaral and Huasco provinces), Coquimbo (El Qui, Limari, and Choapa provinces), Valparaiso (Petorca and Los Andes provinces), Santiago (Santiago Province), O'Higgins (Cachapoal Province), Maule (Curico, Talca, and Linares provinces) and Biobio (Nuble Province) in Chile. The habitat consists of the Northern Desert, Northern Coast, Intermediate Desert, Coquimban Desert, Central Andean Cordillera, Central Valley, Valdivian Forest and the Northern Valdivian Forest biotic provinces.

The length of the forewings is about 7–8.5 mm for males and 7–10.5 mm for females. The forewings are pale grey, with darker scales indicating cross lines and with a variable amount of reddish brown scaling opposite the end of the cell. The hindwings are pale greyish white, but slightly darker distally, and with grey and greyish black scales along the anal margin.

References

Moths described in 1882
sibylla
Moths of South America
Endemic fauna of Chile